Alain Le Grèves (12 October 1939 – 20 September 2000) was a French racing cyclist. He rode in the 1966 Tour de France.

References

1939 births
2000 deaths
French male cyclists
Place of birth missing